Juan Domingo Méndez de Haro y Fernández de Córdoba (Madrid, 25 November 1640 – Madrid, 2 February 1716) was a Spanish military and political figure. He was the son of Don Luis Méndez de Haro, 6th Marquis of Carpio, Prime Minister to King Philip IV of Spain, and of Doña Catalina Fernández de Córdoba.

Biography
He married Doña Inés Francisca de Zúñiga y Fonseca, 6th Countess of Monterrey, and eldest daughter of Don Fernando de Ayala, third Count of Ayala. Juan Domingo also used the family names and titles of his wife for himself.

In 1667 Méndez de Haro went to the Spanish Netherlands, where he became Captain General of the Cavalry in 1669. In 1670 he was appointed Governor of the Habsburg Netherlands and Captain General in the absence of Don John of Austria the Younger.

In 1671, when war threatened between France and the Netherlands, Spain allied itself to the Netherlands and Méndez de Haro became Spanish supreme commander in the North. He organised defences, fortifying the Spanish fortresses along the French border. This could not prevent Spain and its defences from playing a minor part in the following Franco-Dutch War (1672–1678).

He was recalled to Spain on 8 February 1675. On 25 May 1677 he was named Viceroy of Catalonia, where he was also confronted with a French invasion.
In 1678 he returned to Madrid where he became President of Flanders. He was admitted to the State Council in 1693. In 1705 under the French king Philip V of Spain he left the State Council together with the Marquis of Mancera.

In 1710 his wife died without issue and Méndez de Haro decided to dedicate the rest of his life to God and became a Catholic priest.

Sources 
 Biography (in Spanish)

External links

1640 births
1716 deaths
Governors of the Habsburg Netherlands
Spanish untitled nobility
Viceroys of Catalonia
Spanish Roman Catholic priests
Juan Domingo Mendez